Charles Williams (21 April 1886 – 28 Oct 1955) was a Conservative Party politician in England.  He was Member of Parliament (MP) for constituencies in Devon from 1918 to 1922, and from 1924 to 1955.

He was elected to the House of Commons on his first attempt, as a Coalition Conservative candidate for the Tavistock constituency at the 1918 general election, defeating his Liberal Party opponent with a majority of 13% of the votes. However, at the 1922 general election, the Liberal took the seat on a swing of over 10%.

At the 1923 election, he stood in Torquay, where he lost narrowly to the Liberal candidate. He won the seat at the 1924 general election, and represented Torquay in Parliament until his death at the aged of 69, a few months after being returned for the ninth time at the 1955 election.

References

External links 
 

1886 births
1955 deaths
UK MPs 1918–1922
UK MPs 1924–1929
UK MPs 1929–1931
UK MPs 1931–1935
UK MPs 1935–1945
UK MPs 1945–1950
UK MPs 1950–1951
UK MPs 1951–1955
UK MPs 1955–1959
Conservative Party (UK) MPs for English constituencies
Members of the Privy Council of the United Kingdom
Members of the Parliament of the United Kingdom for Tavistock